Pannaulika triassica is a prehistoric plant species assigned to a small, incomplete leaf and two "flowers".

It was found in Carnian rock. The incomplete, dicot-like leaf fragment, measuring 32 mm in length, has a vein structure which suggests the plant to be an angiosperm, but it also shares some characteristics with ferns. Possibly, this means that primitive angiosperms from the Jurassic period evolved in tropic highlands. Plants in this type of environment rarely fossilize, but their seeds can be carried beyond the species' natural range of distribution. This theory suggests that angiosperms only managed to spread in subtropic lowlands, where they have been found in Early Cretaceous rock.

References

 Palmer, Douglas (1999) Life Before Man- The Reader's Digest Association Ltd, p. 121
 

Prehistoric plant genera